Franz Schubert composed his Fantasy in C major for violin and piano, Op. posth. 159,  934, in December 1827. It was the last of his compositions for violin and piano, and was premiered in January 1828 by the violinist Josef Slavik and the pianist Carl Maria von Bocklet at the Landhaussaal in Vienna.

The difficult work was "calculated to display Slavík's virtuoso [violin] technique" and is demanding for both instruments. According to pianist Nikolai Lugansky, the Fantasy "is the most difficult music ever written for the piano", and "more difficult than all of Rachmaninov’s [piano] concertos put together".

Structure 

The work is in three movements:

The second movement, Andantino, is a reworking of Schubert's earlier song "Sei mir gegrüßt" (D 741, 1821–22), formatted as a theme and variations.

References

Citations

Sources

External links 
 

YouTube WQXRClassical: Fantasie in C major, D 934 - Tessa Lark (violin) & Renana Gutman (piano)
YouTube chambermusicsociety: Fantasie in C major, D 934 - Benjamin Beilman (violin) & Juho Pohjonen (piano)

Chamber music by Franz Schubert
Compositions for violin and piano